Mrs. Spring Fragrance was a popular short story collection by Sui Sin Far, pen name of Chinese-British-Canadian-American writer Edith Maude Eaton. The work is notable for being "the earliest book of fiction published in the United States by an author of mixed Chinese and white descent." Although the stories in the collection were written in the late 19th and early 20th centuries, they were not compiled into a single book until 1912. The original publisher was A. C. McClurg and Company of Chicago.  A new scholarly edition of the book, based on the McClurg edition, was released in October 2011 by Broadview Press.

The stories are divided into two halves, "Mrs. Spring Fragrance" for adults, and "Tales of Chinese Children" for children. Set in Seattle and San Francisco, they reflect the struggles and joys in the daily lives of Chinese families in North America. Particularly poignant are the stories delineating the cultural conflicts of Eurasians and recent immigrants. In "In the Land of the Free", Eaton shows the suffering inflicted by discriminatory immigration laws.

Contents 
Mrs. Spring Fragrance
The Inferior Woman - The author of The Inferior Woman is Su Sin Far or (Edith Eaton) 1865–1914. This story is about a culturally complex dynamic from the era in time where women were considered inferior. The character Mrs. Spring Fragrance has a neighbor with a son. The neighbor, Mrs. Carman, wants her son to marry someone of higher social standing, or a modern woman with a good family background and education. In this story, the woman that she wants her son to marry is called Superior Woman. However, Mrs. Spring Fragrance knows that the boy is in love with another girl, known to her as Inferior Woman. Inferior Woman is a girl who sought a job at the neighbor's son's law firm and rose to the rank of secretary through hard work, but Mrs. Carman sees that as a negative, though she calls herself a women's suffragist. Mrs. Fragrance sets out to change Mrs. Carman's mind and eventually succeeds, leading to the marriage of her son and Inferior Woman, whom she no longer regards as inferior.
The Wisdom of the New
"Its Wavering Image"
The Story of One White Woman Who Married A Chinese
Her Chinese Husband
The Americanizing of Pau Tsu
In The Land of the Free
The Chinese Lily
The Smuggling of Tie Co
The God of Restoration
The Prize China Baby
Lin John
Tian Shan's Kindred Spirit
The Sing Song Woman

From Tales of Chinese Children:
Children of Peace
The Banishment of Ming and Mai
The Story of a Little Chinese Seabird
What About the Cat?
The Dreams that Failed
The Heart's Desire
Misunderstood
A Chinese Boy-Girl
Pat and Pan

External links 
 Full text: "Mrs. Spring Fragrance"

References 

1912 short story collections
Asian-American short story collections
Literature by Chinese-American women
A. C. McClurg books
Chinese-American literature